History of Islamic Iran is a four-volume book collection written by Rasul Jafarian in Persian language. In this collection, Jafarian writes the history of Iran from the advent of Islam to the decline of the Safavid Empire. This book has been introduced as one of the master's degree resources in the field of history and Persian literature in Iran.

Structure and content
The History of Islamic Iran book collection has been published in four volumes. The structure and table of contents of this collection are as follows:

First volume: From the origin of Islam to Islamic Iran
 Introduction
 The rise of Islam
 The first caliphate
 Umayyad dynasty
 Abbasid Caliphate

Second volume: From the advent of Tahirid dynasty to the decline of Khwarazmian dynasty
 Iran on a new path: Tahirid dynasty
 Saffarid dynasty
 Samanid dynasty
 Alid dynasties of Tabaristan
 Ziyarid dynasty
 Buyid dynasty
 Islamic civilization and the share of Iran
 Ghaznavids
 Seljuk dynasty
 Alamut state
 Iran in the sixth century AH
 Khwarazmian dynasty

Third volume: From the Mongol conquest to the decline of Turkoman
 From the Mongol conquest to the establishment of the Ilkhanate state
 Ilkhanate
 Local governments in the eighth and ninth centuries AH
 Sarbadars
 Mar'ashis
 Muzaffarids in Fars, Isfahan and Kerman
 Jalayirid Sultanate
 The invasion of Timur and the establishment of the Timurid Empire
 Musha'sha'iyyah and Turkomans

Fourth volume: Safavid dynasty from emergence to decline
 Safavid dynasty
 Ismail and the establishment of the Safavid state
 Tahmasp and the confirmation of the Safavid state
 Tahmasp died and the crisis in the Safavid state
 King Abbas I of Persia
 King Safi of Persia and King Abbas II of Persia
 King Suleiman of Persia
 King Sultan Husayn
 The decline of the Safavid state

Author motivation
Rasul Jafarian in a part of introduction of the first volume of the book, expresses his motivation for writing this book as follows:

Review
The book History of Islamic Iran has been reviewed several times.

See also
 Atlas of Shia
 The specialized library on Islam and Iran
 Bibliography of Rasul Jafarian
 Political History of Islam
 The intellectual and political life of Shia Imams
 Reflection on the Ashura movement
 Rijal al-Kashshi

References

External links
 History of Islamic Iran first volume on Goodreads
 History of Islamic Iran second volume on Goodreads
 History of Islamic Iran third volume on Goodreads
 History of Islamic Iran fourth volume on Goodreads
 Rasul Jafarian - Google Scholar
 Rasul Jafarian articles in English on SID
 Rasul Jafarian English articles on Magiran

Rasul Jafarian's books